Institute for Environmental Solutions (IES) is a non-profit research organization in Latvia that utilizes airborne remote sensing technologies and creates multidisciplinary teams to design and develop innovative environmental solutions. IES is a network-based organization which brings together scientists, artists, engineers and specialists from Latvia and abroad.

IES research projects are aimed to develop innovative terrestrial and aquatic ecosystem status assessment and elaborate sustainable management solutions.

The main research themes of IES: mapping and assessment of land cover/land use; mapping and status assessment of habitats of European Union (EU) importance based on The Habitats Directive; detection and assessment of invasive species; mapping and assessment of forest resources; assessment of forest vitality; landscape planning and management; detection and assessment of archaeological heritage; holistic assessment and restoration of aquatic ecosystems; mapping and assessment of waterbody depth and sediments; research of fish migration and natural reproduction; wildlife mapping and modelling; future satellite simulation.

Technologies 

The institute has considerable expertise in the application of advanced airborne remote sensing for environmental assessment and the management of natural resources. IES has developed a unique Airborne Surveillance and Environmental Monitoring System ARSENAL. The system integrates eight mutually operable sensors which provide high quality data on the terrestrial, marine and freshwater ecosystems, their structure, chemical composition and spatial characteristics.

ARSENAL is embedded in the research aircraft BN-2T-4S Defender.

Main activities 

Institute for Environmental Solutions (IES) will implement two satellite simulation projects as part of the European Space Agency's (ESA) programme "The Plan for European Co-operating States". The first project proposes to simulate the Sentinel-2 satellite for the improvement of land cover/land use monitoring while the second project proposes to simulate the Sentinel-3 satellite for the analysis of optically complex coastal waters such as the Baltic Sea.

IES has been assessing the ecology of the Baltic Sea since 2010. As a part of the MARMONI project, the institute researched the chlorophyll concentration in the Gulf of Riga and Swedish coastline. The airborne remote sensing has been tested and proven its usefulness in HELCOM Balex Delta and CEPCO North international training towards detecting pollution in the Baltic Sea.

IES has built its expertise in the lake fish quantification by cooperating with the world leading experts in the area, such as the Academy of Sciences of the Czech Republic and Finnish Environment Institute (SYKE); IES has been responsible for Latvia's first-ever holistic lake ecosystem and status surveying in Lake Burtnieks; Lake Alūksne; Lake Sāviena; Lake Āraiši. The holistic approach involves the analysis of phytoplankton, zooplankton, zoobenthos, freshwater biology, status of fish population, as well as the measurement and assessment of lake overgrowth, lake depth and sediments through the use of ground-penetrating radar and modelling the nutrient cycle in the lake ecosystem.

Since 2012 IES has been helping the Nature Conservation Agency to fight illegal fishing. By using thermal airborne remote sensing IES is able to identify illegal fishing activities near public lakes, rivers and coastal areas in Latvia.

IES has been testing and adapting an innovative airborne remote sensing approach for the mapping and status assessment of protected habitats of EU importance within and beyond the specially protected nature territories in Latvia. IES is mapping such habitats as coastal and inland dunes, moorland, scrubland, grassland, wetland and forest habitats.

By cooperating with Baltic Environmental Forum and as a part of two international projects Grass Service and Viva Grass IES has carried out the mapping and status assessment of High Nature Value grasslands.

From 2010 to 2013 cooperating with Riga Technical University, IES developed new solutions for mapping the distribution and calculation of biomass of giant hogweed (Heracleum sosnowskyi). The mapping helped to calculate the potential use of environmental waste (such as hogweed) for the 2nd generation biofuel – biobutanol production.

Partnership network 

IES cooperates with world-class scientific institutes, non-governmental organizations, higher education and public institutions and private businesses from Sweden, Canada, UK, Denmark, Norway, Finland, Germany, Estonia, Lithuania, Czech Republic, The Netherlands, Italy, India, Thailand and Latvia.

Environmental science projects are implemented in cooperation with organizations such as “Pasaules Dabas Fonds” (Formerly-WWF Latvia), Latvian Fund for Nature, Baltic Environmental Forum, Finnish Environment Institute (SYKE), Academy of Sciences of the Czech Republic, Swedish University of Agricultural Sciences, Norwegian Forest and Landscape Institute, Latvian Institute of Aquatic Ecology, etc.

References

External links 
 Institute for Environmental Solutions (IES) web site

Non-profit organisations based in Latvia
Environmental organisations based in Latvia
Sustainable technologies
Remote sensing organizations